Hinterrhein District is a former administrative district in the canton of Graubünden, Switzerland. Much of the district became part of the Viamala Region on 1 January 2017 as part of a reorganization of the Canton.

Hinterrhein District consisted of five Kreise (sub-districts) and twenty-four municipalities.  This number decreased from thirty-two when the municipalities of Portein, Präz, Sarn, and Tartar merged on 1 January 2010 into Cazis.  It decreased further in 2015 when Almens, Paspels, Pratval, Rodels and Tomils merged to form the new municipality of Domleschg.

 Includes the area of Portein, Präz, Sarn and Tartar which merged into Cazis on 1 January 2010.

Mergers
On 1 January 2003 the municipalities of Donath and Patzen-Fardün became part of Donat.
On 1 January 2006 Medels im Rheinwald became part of Splügen.
On 1 January 2009 Tomils was created through the merger of Feldis/Veulden, Scheid, Trans and Tumegl/Tomils.
On 1 January 2010 Portein, Präz, Sarn and Tartar merged into Cazis.
On 1 January 2015 Almens, Paspels, Pratval, Rodels and Tomils merged to form Domleschg.

Languages

References

Districts of Graubünden